Mark Harris is a retired lightweight rower who competed for Great Britain.

Rowing career
Harris was selected by Great Britain as part of the lightweight eight that secured a bronze medal at the 1975 World Rowing Championships and a silver medal at the 1976 World Rowing Championships.

References

Year of birth missing (living people)
British male rowers
World Rowing Championships medalists for Great Britain
Living people